The canton of La Montagne noire is an administrative division of the Tarn department, southern France. It was created at the French canton reorganisation which came into effect in March 2015. Its seat is in Labruguière.

It consists of the following communes:
 
Arfons
Belleserre
Cahuzac
Les Cammazes
Dourgne
Durfort
Escoussens
Labruguière
Lagardiolle
Massaguel
Saint-Affrique-les-Montagnes
Saint-Amancet
Saint-Avit
Sorèze
Verdalle

References

Cantons of Tarn (department)